The Sagavanirktok River or Sag River (Iñupiaq: Saġvaaniqtuuq) is a stream in the North Slope Borough of the U.S. state of Alaska. The Trans-Alaska Pipeline System and Dalton Highway roughly parallel it from Atigun Pass to Deadhorse. 

A glaciation happened approximately at the same time as the Illinoian Stage of central North America at the Sagavanirktok River.

See also
List of rivers of Alaska

References

Rivers of North Slope Borough, Alaska
Rivers of Alaska
Brooks Range